Syritta is a genus of hoverflies, family Syrphidae.

The genus probably originated in the Afrotropical region. 13 of the 18 recognized species groups are found south of the Sahara. 15 species inhabit the Oriental and Australian-Pacific regions, and only six species are described from the Palearctic region. The two species that occur in North America as far south as Mexico, S. flaviventris and S. pipiens, were probably introduced by humans.

One of the most common species of this genus is Syritta pipiens, a hoverfly from Europe, currently distributed across Eurasia and North America.

Species

References

 Australian/Oceanian Diptera Catalog: Syrphidae
 BugGuide.net: Syritta pipiens
 Nearctica.com: Syrphidae

Eristalinae
Hoverfly genera
Diptera of Europe
Diptera of North America
Diptera of Africa
Taxa named by Amédée Louis Michel le Peletier
Taxa named by Jean Guillaume Audinet-Serville